Trisakti Museum or May 12 Tragedy Museum is a human rights museum in Jakarta, Indonesia. The museum documents the active role of Indonesian students at Trisakti University in fighting for democracy and human rights.

The museum briefly tells about four students who were shot on May 12, 1998. In the museum there are short articles, a collection of news from newspapers, ornaments, demonstration photographs, photographs of the deceased, and their relics.

History
Trisakti Museum was established with the background of the Indonesian university student movement in 1998, when the students across Indonesia rallied to demand reform.

The students at Trisakti University, as a part of the students in Indonesia as a whole, participated in a peaceful protest movement. The movement reach its peak when four students at Trisakti University were killed on May 12, 1998. This incident triggered the fall of Orde Baru.

To commemorate the tragedy, the museum was placed in the lobby of the Dr Syarif Thajeb building, on the campus of Trisakti University, Grogol, West Jakarta.

See also
 Indonesian Revolution of 1998
 Trisakti shootings
 List of museums and cultural institutions in Indonesia

References

1998 in Indonesia
Museums with year of establishment missing
Museums in Jakarta
History museums in Indonesia
University museums in Indonesia
Human rights museums
History of Jakarta
Human rights organizations based in Indonesia
West Jakarta